Lielauce Parish is an administrative unit of Dobele Municipality, Latvia. Before the 2021 administrative reforms it was part of Auce Municipality.

Towns, villages and settlements of Lielauce parish 
Lielauce
Ķieģeļceplis
Ražotāji

Parishes of Latvia
Dobele Municipality
Semigallia